The 1986 New South Wales Rugby League premiership was the seventy-ninth season of professional rugby league football in Australia. Thirteen clubs competed for the J J Giltinan Shield and Winfield Cup during the season, which culminated in a grand final between the Parramatta Eels and Canterbury-Bankstown Bulldogs which featured the introduction of the Clive Churchill Medal. This season, NSWRL teams also competed for the 1986 National Panasonic Cup.

Season summary

This season saw the opening of the new, 30,000 capacity Parramatta Stadium as the home ground for the Parramatta Eels and on 29 June the final game was played at the old Sydney Sports Ground: Eastern Suburbs Roosters v North Sydney Bears.

In total twenty-six regular season rounds were played from March till September, resulting in a top five of Parramatta, South Sydney, Canterbury-Bankstown (the defending premiers), Manly-Warringah and Balmain who battled it out in the finals (after Balmain had defeated North Sydney in a playoff for 5th spot). Parramatta completed a perfect season, winning the pre-season competition, the midweek Panasonic Cup, finishing the regular season as minor premiers, winning the grand final and farewelling their international long time stars Mick Cronin and Ray Price as victorious champions.

The 1986 season's Rothmans Medallist was Manly-Warringah hooker, Mal Cochrane. Parramatta's halfback, Peter Sterling won the Dally M Award as well as Rugby League Week's player of the year award. The Coca-Cola Rugby League Coach-of-the-Year award was given to George Piggins who took South Sydney to the finals in his first year as coach.

The new management and marketing direction that had been undertaken by the NSWRL in the 1980s meant that at the end of this season the League was able to announce a profit of $3.7 million and an increase in attendance of 22%.

23 of the 28 players selected to go on the 1986 Kangaroo tour of Great Britain and France at the end of the season were from the NSWRL. Like the Kangaroos of 1982 who went through their tour undefeated to earn the nickname "The Invincibles", the 1986 Kangaroos would also go through undefeated, earning the nickname "The Unbeatables"

Teams
The lineup of clubs remained unchanged from the previous year, with thirteen contesting the premiership, including five Sydney-based foundation teams, another six from Sydney, one from greater New South Wales and one from the Australian Capital Territory.

Advertising
1986 saw the NSWRL's agency, John Singleton Advertising produce an ad themed around the Gladiators photo and the then premiership trophy. The finished 60sec ad is presented with moving footage and stills from the 1963 grand final showing Provan and Summons embrace and stills shots of other 1970s champions including Bob Fulton, Arthur Beetson and John Sattler interspersed with 1985 season images.

The theme is of past heroes "who played it tough but played it fair" and the ad closes with the question as to who this year will claim the "Greatest Prize of All" - being the Winfield Cup Trophy, featuring the "Gladiators" statue.

Regular season

Bold – Home game
X – Bye
Opponent for round listed above margin

Ladder

Ladder progression

Numbers highlighted in green indicate that the team finished the round inside the top 5.
Numbers highlighted in blue indicates the team finished first on the ladder in that round.
Numbers highlighted in red indicates the team finished last place on the ladder in that round.
Underlined numbers indicate that the team had a bye during that round.

Finals

Chart

Grand final

Eels coach John Monie had stepped into the large shoes left by Jack Gibson in 1984 and was under pressure to ensure Parramatta did not fall short for a third year. Eels legends Ray Price and Mick Cronin were in their farewell seasons and the Eels fans at least wanted to see them go out on a winning note. Everything had augured well right through the season with a Parramatta victory in the pre-season competition, the midweek National Panasonic cup and the minor premiership.

The Bulldogs on the other hand were building a dynasty under the Warren Ryan-coached style of uncompromising defence that had changed the game. In prop Peter Kelly, hooker Mark Bugden and three-quarter Andrew Farrar, Ryan possessed a number of defensive hitmen capable of carrying out his game plan.

Parramatta's Mick Cronin required a police escort to the match after being stuck in a traffic jam.

The grand final was fifteen minutes old when Eels winger Mick Delroy was knocked out by a high shot from Farrar while Price suffered a constant barrage from Kelly throughout the first half. Referee Mick Stone at least initially appeared reluctant to send anyone off and Farrar and Kelly benefitted.

Stone also disallowed two near tries in the first half to Eels five-eighth Brett Kenny who was ultimately frustrated in his attempt to replicate the two tries per grand final statistic that he'd maintained in each of the 1981, 1982 and 1983 deciders.

It wasn't until Kelly was sin-binned for 10 minutes for a high tackle on Price that the Eels started to find gaps in the Bulldogs line. Two minutes before half time and still with 12 men Canterbury looked in trouble when Eric Grothe Sr. set off down the sideline with a clear path. A desperate Steve Mortimer cover-defending run brought Grothe down metres from the tryline. A minute later Cronin opened the scoring for the Eels with a successful penalty goal.

Twelve minutes into the second half, Canterbury five-eighth Terry Lamb levelled the score with a penalty goal after Peter Sterling was penalised for a late tackle on Steve Mortimer.

With eighteen minutes remaining, Canterbury replacement forward David Boyd was penalised for a high tackle on Price who had by now suffered an hour of ferocious Bulldog attention. Price appeared concussed and the Parramatta trainers unsuccessfully tried to convince him to leave the field. Cronin kicked the resultant penalty and the Eels again took a 2-point lead.

After Canterbury fullback Phil Sigsworth was sent off for a high shot on Kenny, the 12 remaining Bulldogs lifted a level and continued with attacking surges. Farrar was stopped by the Eels defence centimetres from the line, Lamb missed an opportunity to level with another penalty attempt and then right on the bell Parramatta forward Michael Moseley, in a career highlight moment, cut down Bugden as the Bulldogs hooker appeared certain to score.

Parramatta had taken on Canterbury at their own game - defence-focused trench warfare and managed to keep the game tryless and win the battle of attrition. In the process they halted Canterbury's hopes of three successive titles in the first try-less grand final.

Parramatta 4Goals: Cronin 2

Canterbury-Bankstown 2Goals: Lamb 1

Clive Churchill Medal: Peter Sterling (Parramatta)

Player statistics
The following statistics are as of the conclusion of Round 26.

Top 5 point scorers

Top 5 try scorers

Top 5 goal scorers

References

External links
 Rugby League Tables - Season 1986 The World of Rugby League
 1986 Winfield Cup TVC YouTube.
 Clarkson, Alan (1997). The Greatest Games We Ever Played (Essay Collection, ed. Geoff Prenter). Sydney: Ironbark Publishing.
Results:1981-90 at rabbitohs.com.au
1986 J J Giltinan Shield and Winfield Cup at rleague.com
NSWRL season 1986 at rugbyleagueproject.com

New South Wales Rugby League premiership
NSWRL season